Prince Boris Aleksandrovich Vasilchikov (1863, Vybiti, Novgorod Governorate – 1931, Menton) — Russian politician.

Biography 
Graduate of the Imperial School of Law; entered the Ministry of Justice, 1881.

Elected Marshal of Nobility of Staraia Russa Uezd, 1884, of Novgorod Guberniya (1890).

Governor of Pskov (1900–1903); Head of the Red Cross for the Northeastern District during the Russo-Japanese War. Chairman of the Russian Red Cross Society.

Member of the State Council (1906). Head of the Chief Administration of Land Organization and Agriculture in the Pyotr Stolypin cabinet (July 1906 – May 1908).

Emigrated to France in 1920 from the USSR after the 1917 revolution.

Sources 
 V.I. Gurko. Features And Figures Of The Past. Government And Opinion In The Reign Of Nicholas II.

1863 births
1931 deaths
People from Novgorod Oblast
People from Starorussky Uyezd
Russian princes
Russian nationalists
Government ministers of Russia
Members of the State Council (Russian Empire)
Marshals of nobility
Russian memoirists
Imperial School of Jurisprudence alumni
Recipients of the Order of the White Eagle (Russia)
Recipients of the Order of St. Vladimir, 2nd class
Recipients of the Order of St. Anna, 1st class
Prisoners of the Peter and Paul Fortress